There are Bengali and English versions of schools and colleges for boys and girls controlled by the Bangladesh Navy.

Dhaka Area 

 BN College Dhaka
Navy Anchorage School and College Dhaka
Nau Paribar Shishu Niketon Dhaka

Chittagong Area 
 BN School and College Chittagong
BN School Kaptai
Navy Anchorage School and College Chittagong
Nau Paribar Shishu Niketon Chittagong - 1 & 2
Nau Paribar Shishu Niketon Kaptai
Ashar Alo
Rangunia Navy school

Khulna Area 

 Bangladesh Noubahini School and College Khulna
BN School and College Mongla
Navy Anchorage School and College Khulna
Nau Paribar Shishu Niketon Khulna
Nau Paribar Shishu Niketon Mongla

References 

Bangladesh Navy
Educational Institutions in Bangladesh